Hristovtsi may refer to the following places in Bulgaria:

Hristovtsi, Gabrovo Province
Hristovtsi, Veliko Tarnovo Province